Hiromasa Ougikubo   (born 1 April 1987) is a Japanese mixed martial artist currently competing as a flyweight in the Rizin Fighting Federation. A professional since 2006, he has also competed for Shooto, Vale Tudo Japan, and The Ultimate Fighter.

He is the former Shooto World Bantamweight (123 lb) Champion, a former Shooto Featherweight Champion and the 2014 Vale Tudo Japan flyweight tournament champion. As an amateur, he was the 12th All Japan Amateur Shooto Featherweight tournament champion and the 4th Tohoku Amateur Shooto Open Tournament champion.

He holds notable wins over the former ONE Championship and Shooto strawweight champion Yosuke Saruta, the former Pancrase Flyweight Champion Kiyotaka Shimizu, the current Pancrase Bantamweight Champion Shintaro Ishiwatari, as well as wins over Alexandre Pantoja and Adam Antolin.

Mixed martial arts career

Shooto
Hiromasa Ougikubo began his mixed martial arts career in 2005, as an amateur in Shooto. He first competed in the East Japan Amateur Shooto Freshman tournament, where he lost the finals. Following that loss he entered and won the 4th Tohoku Amateur Shooto Open Tournament. His last amateur appearance was at the 12th All Japan Amateur Shooto Featherweight Championship Tournament. Ougikubo defeated all four of his opponents to win the tournament.

Ougikubo made his professional debut with Shooto in 2006, when he defeated Nobuhiro Hayakawa by a unanimous decision. After a draw against Naoki Yahagi, Ougikubo would beat Satoru Ota and Kazuya Tamura to set up a fight in the Shooto Rookie Featherweight tournament finals fight against Yasuhiro Kanayama. He won the bout in the second round by way of a rear naked choke.

Over the next five years, Ougikubo would accumulate a 5-2-1 record, most notably losing to the future Shooto Featherweight Champion Koetsu Okazaki, and winning the Shooto Pacific Rim featherweight title by defeating Teriyuki Matsumoto. In 2012, at Shooto 5th Round, Ougikubo would get a chance to avenge that loss. Hiromasa would win the fight in the third minute of the third round, by way of a rear naked choke, in what was considered, at the time, a major upset. His first title defense was scheduled against the young prospect Kyoji Horiguchi. Horiguchi would defend or reverse the takedowns, deliver ground and pound from the guard, and would eventually submit Ougikubo in the second round.

Looking to bounce back, Ougikubo entered the 2014 Vale Tudo Japan Flyweight tournament. In the quarterfinals he defeated Takeshi Kasugai by a majority decision. In the semifinals he submitted Kana Hyatt in the first round. Proceeding to the finals against Czar Sklavos, Ougikubo came out the victor after 25 minutes, being declared the tournament champion, by a clear unanimous decision.

Returning to Shooto he was scheduled to face Mamoru Yamaguchi. The fight had to cancelled, after Ougikubo dislocated his shoulder.

His next fight was scheduled against Yosuke Saruta, which he won by a unanimous decision. This gave him his second chance at Shooto gold, as he was set to fight the bantamweight champion Masaaki Sugawara. He won the fight in the last seconds of the fifth round by a guillotine choke.

The Ultimate Fighter
Considered a standout fighter in the Asian MMA scene, with an impressive fight style and being undefeated in three years, Ougikubo was invited to the 24th season of The Ultimate Fighter, called The Ultimate Fighter: Tournament of Champions.

His first fight was against the EFC flyweight champion Nkazimulo Zulu. Ougikubo entered the fight as a favorite, being the no.5 seed, while Zulu was the no.12 seed. Ougikubo submitted Zulu in the second round, with a rear naked choke.

Next, he faced Adam Antolin, in a fight between two high level grapplers. Ougikubo would aggressively out grapple Antolin, with the American being forced to defend for the entirety of the fight. The Japanese fighter won a clear unanimous decision.

Ougikubo would then face the no.1 seed Alexandre Pantoja. He would force wrestling exchanges with Pantoja, working from his opponents guard, grinding away a unanimous decision win.

In his final fight of the show, Ougikubo fought against Tim Elliott. He fell short for the first time, and lost the finals by a unanimous decision.

Return to Shooto
Returning to Shooto he fought against the Ultimate Fighting Championship veteran Danny Martinez. Ougikubo won a unanimous decision.

He would then defend the Shooto World Bantamweight (123 lb) Championship against Tadaaki Yamamoto. He won the fight with a rear naked choke to defend his Shooto title.

Rizin Fighting Federation
Ougikubo signed with Rizin and made his debut at Rizin 11, when he was scheduled to rematch Kyoji Horiguchi. Horiguchi once again won, this time through a unanimous decision.

Ougikubo fought the former Shooto and ONE Championship champion Yoshitaka Naito in a Shooto exhibition bout. The fight ended in a no contest after just three minutes.

Making his second bantamweight title defense, Ougikubo faced Kiyotaka Shimizu. While the fight saw little action in the first three rounds, Ougikubo managed to cut his opponent with a head kick. In the fourth round a head clash ended the fight prematurely and went to the judge's scorecards. Hiromasa won a unanimous decision to secure his second title defense.

Returning to Rizin, he fought against the former DEEP champion Yuki Motoya. Ougikubo won a split decision.

During Rizin 20, he fought against Shintaro Ishiwatari. He won another split decision.

He fought against Kai Asakura for the Rizin Bantamweight Championship at Rizin 23. He lost via first-round knockout.

Ougikubo was scheduled to fight Kenta Takizawa during Rizin 25. He defeated Takizawa by unanimous decision.

On January 31, 2021, Ougikubo vacated the Shooto Shooto Bantamweight (123 lb) Championship.

Rizin Bantamweight Grand Prix 2021 
Ougikubo faced Takeshi Kasugai in the opening round of the Bantamweight Grand Prix at Rizin 28 on June 13, 2021. Ougikubo won the fight by unanimous decision. Ougikubo faced Takafumi Otsuka in the quarterfinals on September 19, 2021 at Rizin 30. He won the fight by unanimous decision.

In the semi-finals, Ougikubo faced Naoki Inoue on December 31, 2021 at Rizin 33. He won the fight by unanimous decision, and faced Kai Asakura in the tournament finals, which were held during Rizin 33 as well. He won the bout via unanimous decision, winning the 2021 Rizin Bantamweight Grand Prix.

Later Rizin career
Ougikubo was booked to face the Road FC Featherweight champion Soo Chul Kim at Rizin 38 on September 25, 2022. Although he was scrambled from start to finish, he was outnumbered by Kim's punches and suffered two facial fractures, resulting in a 0-3 unanimous decision loss.

Moving down to Flyweight, Ougikubo faced Kyoji Horiguchi at Bellator MMA vs. Rizin on December 31, 2022. Facing Horiguchi for the third time in his career, Ougikubo lost the bout via unanimous decision, making it the third straight loss to Horiguchi.

Championships and accomplishments

Amateur titles
Shooto
12th All Japan Amateur Shooto Featherweight Tournament Championship
4th Tohoku Amateur Shooto Open Tournament

Professional titles
Shooto
2007 Shooto Rookie Featherweight Tournament Champion
Shooto Pacific Rim Featherweight Championship (One time)
Shooto Featherweight (132 lb) Championship (One time)
Shooto World Bantamweight (123 lb) Championship (One time)
Two Successful Title Defenses
Vale Tudo Japan
2014 VTJ Flyweight Tournament Championship
Rizin Fighting Federation
2021 Rizin Bantamweight Grand Prix Champion
eFight.com
October 2014 and December 2021 Fighter of the Month

Mixed martial arts record
 

|-
|Loss
|align=center| 
|Kyoji Horiguchi
|Decision (unanimous)
|Bellator MMA vs. Rizin
|
|align=center| 3
|align=center| 5:00
|Saitama, Japan
|
|-
|Loss
|align=center|
|Soo Chul Kim
|Decision (unanimous)
|Rizin 38
|
|align=center|3
|align=center|5:00
|Saitama, Japan
|
|-
|Win
|align=center|25–5–2
|Kai Asakura
|Decision (unanimous)
| rowspan=2|Rizin 33
| rowspan=2|
|align=center|3
|align=center|5:00
| rowspan=2|Saitama, Japan
|
|-
|Win
|align=center|24–5–2
|Naoki Inoue
|Decision (unanimous)
|align=center|3
|align=center|5:00
|
|-
|Win
|align=center|23–5–2
|Takafumi Otsuka
|Decision (unanimous)
|Rizin 30
|
|align=center|3
|align=center|5:00
|Saitama, Japan
|
|-
|Win
|align=center|22–5–2
|Takeshi Kasugai
|Decision (unanimous)
|Rizin 28
|
|align=center|3
|align=center|5:00
|Tokyo, Japan
|
|-
|Win
|align=center|21–5–2
|Kenta Takizawa
|Decision (unanimous)
|Rizin 25
|
|align=center|3
|align=center|5:00
|Osaka, Japan
|
|-
|Loss
|align=center|20–5–2
|Kai Asakura
|KO (knee and soccer kicks)
|Rizin 23
|
|align=center|1
|align=center|4:31
|Yokohama, Japan
|
|-
|Win
|align=center|20–4–2
|Shintaro Ishiwatari
|Decision (split)
|Rizin 20
|
|align=center|3
|align=center|5:00
|Saitama, Japan
|
|-
|Win
|align=center|19–4–2
|Yuki Motoya
|Decision (split)
|Rizin 17
|
|align=center|3
|align=center|5:00
|Saitama, Japan
|
|-
|Win
|align=center|18–4–2
|Kiyotaka Shimizu
|Technical Decision (unanimous)
|Shooto 30th Anniversary Tour at Korakuen Hall
|
|align=center|4
|align=center|0:40
|Tokyo, Japan
|
|-
|Loss
|align=center|17–4–2
|Kyoji Horiguchi
|Decision (unanimous)
|Rizin 11
|
|align=center|2
|align=center|5:00
|Saitama, Japan
|
|-
|Win
|align=center|17–3–2
|Tadaaki Yamamoto
|Submission (rear-naked choke)
|Professional Shooto 10/15
|
|align=center|1
|align=center|4:26
|Chiba, Japan
|
|-
|Win
|align=center|16–3–2
|Danny Martinez
|Decision (unanimous)
|Professional Shooto 4/23
|
|align=center|3
|align=center|5:00
|Chiba, Japan
|
|-
|Win
|align=center|15–3–2
|Masaaki Sugawara
|Technical Submission (guillotine choke)
|Mobstyles Presents Fight & Mosh
|
|align=center|5
|align=center|4:48
|Chiba, Japan
|
|-
|Win
|align=center|14–3–2
|Yosuke Saruta
|Decision (unanimous)
|Professional Shooto 11/29
|
|align=center|3
|align=center|5:00
|Chiba, Japan
|
|-
|Win
|align=center|13–3–2
|Czar Sklavos
|Decision (unanimous)
|VTJ 6th
|
|align=center|5
|align=center|5:00
|Tokyo, Japan
|
|-
|Win
|align=center|12–3–2
|Kana Hyatt
|Submission (rear-naked choke)
|VTJ 5th in Osaka
|
|align=center|1
|align=center|1:20
|Osaka, Japan
|
|-
|Win
|align=center|11–3–2
|Takeshi Kasugai
|Decision (majority)
|VTJ 4th
|
|align=center|3
|align=center|5:00
|Tokyo, Japan
|
|-
|Loss
|align=center|10–3–2
|Kyoji Horiguchi
|Submission (rear-naked choke)
|Shooto - 2nd Round 2013
|
|align=center|2
|align=center|1:35
|Tokyo, Japan
|
|-
|Win
|align=center|10–2–2
|Koetsu Okazaki
|Submission (rear-naked choke)
|Shooto - 5th Round
|
|align=center|3
|align=center|3:32
|Tokyo, Japan
|
|-
|Win
|align=center|9–2–2
|Tetsu Suzuki
|Decision (unanimous)
|Survivor Tournament Final
|
|align=center|3
|align=center|5:00
|Tokyo, Japan
|
|-
|Win
|align=center|8–2–2
|Teruyuki Matsumoto
|Decision (majority)
|Shooto - Border: Season 3 - Spring Thunder
|
|align=center|3
|align=center|5:00
|Osaka, Japan
|
|-
|Win
|align=center|7–2–2
|So Tazawa
|Decision (unanimous)
|The Way of Shooto 5: Like a Tiger, Like a Dragon
|
|align=center|3
|align=center|5:00
|Tokyo, Japan
|
|-
|Loss
|align=center|6–2–2
|Eduardo Dantas
|Submission (rear-naked choke)
|The Way of Shooto 3: Like a Tiger, Like a Dragon
|
|align=center|3
|align=center|1:21
|Tokyo, Japan
|
|-
|Loss
|align=center|6–1–2
|Koetsu Okazaki
|TKO (punches)
|Shooto - Gig Tokyo 3
|
|align=center|2
|align=center|2:08
|Tokyo, Japan
|
|-
|Win
|align=center|6–0–2
|Tetsu Suzuki
|Decision (unanimous)
|Shooto Tradition 6
|
|align=center|3
|align=center|5:00
|Tokyo, Japan
|
|-
|Draw
|align=center|4–0–2
|So Tazawa
|Draw
|Shooto Tradition 4
|
|align=center|3
|align=center|5:00
|Tokyo, Japan
|
|-
|Win
|align=center|4–0–1
|Hiroyuki Tanaka
|TKO (punches)
|Shooto Tradition 2
|
|align=center|1
|align=center|1:35
|Tokyo, Japan
|
|-
|Win
|align=center|4–0–1
|Yasuhiro Kanayama
|Submission (rear-naked choke)
|Shooto - Rookie Tournament 2007 Final
|
|align=center|2
|align=center|3:35
|Tokyo, Japan
|
|-
|Win
|align=center|3–0–1
|Kazuya Tamura
|Submission (rear-naked choke)
|Shooto - Back To Our Roots 5
|
|align=center|1
|align=center|3:43
|Tokyo, Japan
|
|-
|Win
|align=center|2–0–1
|Satoru Ota
|Decision (unanimous)
|Shooto 2007 - 6/30 in Kitazawa Town Hall
|
|align=center|2
|align=center|5:00
|Tokyo, Japan
|
|-
|Draw
|align=center|1–0–1
|Naoki Yahagi
|Draw
|Shooto - It's Strong Being a Man
|
|align=center|2
|align=center|5:00
|Tokyo, Japan
|
|-
|Yes
|align=center|1–0
|Nobuhiro Hayakawa
|Decision (unanimous)
|Shooto 2006 - 10/1 in Kitazawa Town Hall
|
|align=center|2
|align=center|5:00
|Tokyo, Japan
|
|-
|}

Mixed martial arts exhibition record

|-
|NC
|align=center|3–1 (1)
| Yoshitaka Naito
| No contest
| THE SHOOTO OKINAWA vol.1
| 
|align=center|1
|align=center|3:00
|Okinawa, Japan
|
|-
|-
|Loss
|align=center|3–1
| Tim Elliott
| Decision (unanimous)
| rowspan=4| The Ultimate Fighter: Tournament of Champions
| 
|align=center|3
|align=center|5:00
| rowspan=4|Las Vegas, Nevada, United States
|
|-
|Win
|align=center|3–0
| Alexandre Pantoja
| Decision (unanimous)
| 
|align=center|2
|align=center|5:00
|
|-
|Win
|align=center|2–0
| Adam Antolin
| Decision (unanimous)
| 
|align=center|2
|align=center|5:00
|
|-
|Win
|align=center|1–0
| Nkazimulo Zulu
| Submission (rear-naked choke)
| 
|align=center|2
|align=center|3:44
|

Amateur mixed martial arts record

|-
|Win
|align=center|10-1
|Atsushi Asano
|Decision (Unanimous)
|12th All Japan Amateur Shooto Championship
|
|align=center|2
|align=center|3:00
|Tokyo, Japan
|
|-
|Win
|align=center|9-1
|Kazuya Tamura
|Decision (Unanimous)
|12th All Japan Amateur Shooto Championship
|
|align=center|1
|align=center|4:00
|Tokyo, Japan
|
|-
|Win
|align=center|8-1
|Kobe Takuyaki
|Decision (Unanimous)
|12th All Japan Amateur Shooto Championship
|
|align=center|1
|align=center|4:00
|Tokyo, Japan
|
|-
|Win
|align=center|7-1
|Akitoshi Mori 
|Decision (Unanimous)
|12th All Japan Amateur Shooto Championship
|
|align=center|1
|align=center|4:00
|Tokyo, Japan
|
|-
|Win
|align=center|6-1
|Yuichiro Takase
|Decision (Unanimous)
|4th Tohoku Amateur Shooto Open Tournament
|
|align=center|2
|align=center|3:00
|Tōhoku, Japan
|
|-
|Win
|align=center|5-1
|Yoshihiko Matsumoto
|Decision (Unanimous)
|4th Tohoku Amateur Shooto Open Tournament
|
|align=center|1
|align=center|4:00
|Tōhoku, Japan
|
|-
|Win
|align=center|4-1
|Kikuchi 
|Decision (Unanimous)
|4th Tohoku Amateur Shooto Open Tournament
|
|align=center|1
|align=center|4:00
|Tōhoku, Japan
|
|-
|Loss
|align=center|3-1
|Takahiro Ogoshi
|Decision (Unanimous)
|East Japan Amateur Shooto Freshman tournament
|
|align=center|1
|align=center|4:00
|N/A, Japan
|
|-
|Win
|align=center|3-0
|Yuki Yasunaga
|Decision (Unanimous)
|East Japan Amateur Shooto Freshman tournament
|
|align=center|1
|align=center|4:00
|N/A, Japan
|
|-
|Win
|align=center|2-0
|Masato Seki
|Decision (Unanimous)
|East Japan Amateur Shooto Freshman tournament
|
|align=center|1
|align=center|4:00
|N/A, Japan
|
|-
|Win
|align=center|1-0
|Yosuke Ota
|Decision (Unanimous)
|East Japan Amateur Shooto Freshman tournament
|
|align=center|1
|align=center|4:00
|N/A, Japan
|
|-
|}

See also
List of current Rizin FF fighters
 List of male mixed martial artists

References 

Rizin Fighting Federation
1987 births
Japanese male mixed martial artists
People from Iwate Prefecture
Shooto
Flyweight mixed martial artists
Bantamweight mixed martial artists
Featherweight mixed martial artists
Mixed martial artists utilizing Kyokushin kaikan
Mixed martial artists utilizing shootboxing
Japanese male karateka
Living people